The 2022 Atlantic 10 Conference baseball tournament will take place from May 24 to 28. The top seven regular season finishers of the league's twelve teams will meet in the double-elimination tournament to be held at T. Henry Wilson Jr. Field, the home field of Davidson in Davidson, North Carolina. The winner will earn the conference's automatic bid to the 2022 NCAA Division I baseball tournament.

Seeding and format
The tournament will use the same format adopted in 2014, with the top seven finishers from the regular season seeded one through seven. The top seed will receive a single bye while remaining seeds will play on the first day.

Bracket

References

Tournament
Atlantic 10 Conference Baseball Tournament
Atlantic 10 baseball tournament